Living with Yourself is an American science fiction comedy-drama streaming television series created by Timothy Greenberg that premiered on October 18, 2019, on Netflix. The series stars Paul Rudd and Aisling Bea. Rudd also serves as an executive producer, alongside Greenberg, Anthony Bregman, Jeff Stern, Tony Hernandez, Jonathan Dayton, Valerie Faris, and Jeffrey Blitz.

Synopsis
Living with Yourself follows the story of a man who, after undergoing a mysterious treatment that promises him the allure of a better life, discovers that he has been replaced by a cloned version of himself.

Cast and characters

Main

 Paul Rudd as Miles Elliot, a copywriter at Pool Branding who is unhappy with his life, and his more optimistic clone.
 Aisling Bea as Kate Elliot, Miles's wife, an interior architect.

Recurring
 Alia Shawkat as Maia, Miles's younger half-sister
 Desmin Borges as Dan, Miles's co-worker
 Karen Pittman as Lenore Pool, Miles's boss
 Zoe Chao as Kaylyn, a receptionist at Pool Branding
 Rob Yang as Left / Yongsu, a Top Happy Spa employee
 James Seol as Right / Jung-Ho, a Top Happy Spa employee

Guest
 Jon Glaser as Henry
 Emily Young as Mousy Co-Worker
 Eden Malyn as Margaret
 Ginger Gonzaga as Meg, Kate's business partner
 Gabrielle Reid as Branding Co-worker
 Gene Jones as Farmer Ray
 Zach Cherry as Hugh
 Tom Brady as himself

Episodes

Production
On February 16, 2017, it was announced that IFC had given a series greenlight to a new comedy series created by Timothy Greenberg. Executive producers for the series were expected to include Greenberg, Jeffrey Blitz, Anthony Bregman, and Jeff Stern. Blitz was also set to serve as a director and the series was slated to premiere in 2018. Production companies involved with the series were scheduled to consist of Likely Story and Jax Media.

On August 10, 2018, it was announced that the project had moved to Netflix, which had given the production a series order for a first season consisting of eight episodes. The series was set to be written by Greenberg, who was also expected to executive produce alongside Blitz, Bregman, Stern, Tony Hernandez, Jonathan Dayton, Valerie Faris, and Paul Rudd. Dayton and Faris were also anticipated to serve as directors for the series.

Alongside the announcement of the series’ move to Netflix, it was confirmed that Paul Rudd had been cast in the dual lead roles. On August 28, 2018, it was announced that Aisling Bea had joined the cast. Principal photography for the first season took place on location in New York City in 2018.

On October 18, 2019, Living With Yourself was officially released on Netflix.

Reception
On review aggregator website Rotten Tomatoes, the series holds an approval rating of 81% based on 76 critic ratings, with an average rating of 7.15/10. The website's critical consensus reads, "Strange, surreal, and surprising, Living With Yourself can't quite sustain its high-concept premise, but it remains engaging thanks to its clever writing and the sheer force of Paul Rudd's dueling performances." On Metacritic, it has a weighted average score of 70 out of 100, based on 26 critics, indicating "generally favorable reviews".

Accolades

References

External links
 
 

2010s American black comedy television series
2010s American comedy-drama television series
2019 American television series debuts
2019 American television series endings
English-language Netflix original programming
Television series about cloning
Television shows filmed in New York City
Works by Jonathan Dayton and Valerie Faris